A meat alternative or meat substitute (also called plant-based meat or fake meat, sometimes pejoratively) is a food product made from vegetarian or vegan ingredients, eaten as a replacement for meat. Meat alternatives typically approximate qualities of specific types of meat, such as mouthfeel, flavor, appearance, or chemical characteristics. Plant- and fungus-based substitutes are frequently made with soy (e.g. tofu, tempeh, and textured vegetable protein), but may also be made from wheat gluten as in seitan, pea protein as in the Beyond Burger, or mycoprotein as in Quorn.

Meat alternatives are typically consumed as a source of dietary protein by vegetarians, vegans, and people following religious and cultural dietary laws. However, global demand for sustainable diets has also increased their popularity among non-vegetarians and flexitarians seeking to reduce the environmental impact of meat production.

Meat substitution has a long history. Tofu was invented in China as early as 200 BCE, and in the Middle Ages, chopped nuts and grapes were used as a substitute for mincemeat during Lent. Since the 2010s, startup companies such as Impossible Foods and Beyond Meat have popularized pre-made plant-based substitutes for ground beef, patties, and vegan chicken nuggets as commercial products.

History 

Tofu, a meat alternative made from soybeans, was invented in China by the Han dynasty (206 BC–220 CE). Drawings of tofu production have been discovered in a Han dynasty tomb. Its use as a meat alternative is recorded in a document written by Tao Gu (903–970). Tao describes how tofu was popularly known as "small mutton", which shows that the Chinese valued tofu as an imitation meat. Tofu was widely consumed during the Tang dynasty (618–907), and likely spread to Japan during the later Tang or early Song dynasty.

In the third century CE, Athenaeus describes a preparation of mock anchovy in his work Deipnosophistae:

Wheat gluten has been documented in China since the sixth century. The oldest reference to wheat gluten appears in the Qimin Yaoshu, a Chinese agricultural encyclopedia written by Jia Sixie in 535. The encyclopedia mentions noodles prepared from wheat gluten called bo duo. Wheat gluten was known as mian jin by the Song dynasty (960–1279).

Prior to the arrival of Buddhism, northern China was predominantly a meat-consuming culture. The vegetarian dietary laws of Buddhism led to development of meat substitutes as a replacement for the meat-based dishes that the Chinese were no longer able to consume as Buddhists. Meat alternatives such as tofu and wheat gluten are still associated with Buddhist cuisine in China and other parts of East Asia. Meat alternatives were also popular in Medieval Europe during Lent, which prohibited the consumption of warm-blooded animals, eggs, and dairy products. Chopped almonds and grapes were used as a substitute for mincemeat. Diced bread was made into imitation cracklings and greaves.

John Harvey Kellogg developed meat replacements variously from nuts, grains, and soy, starting around 1877, to feed patients in his vegetarian Battle Creek Sanitarium. Kellogg's Sanitas Nut Food Company sold his meat substitute Protose, made from peanuts and wheat gluten. It became Kellogg's most popular product as several thousand tons had been consumed by 1930.

There was an increased interest in meat substitutes during the late 19th century and first half of the 20th century. Prior to 1950, interest in plant-based meat substitutes came from vegetarians searching for alternatives to meat protein for ethical reasons, and regular meat-eaters who were confronted with food shortages during World War I and World War II.

Henrietta Latham Dwight authored a vegetarian cookbook, The Golden Age Cook-Book in 1898 which included meat substitute recipes such as a "mock chicken" recipe made from breadcrumbs, eggs, lemon juice and walnuts and a "mock clam soup" made from marrowfat beans and cream. Dietitian Sarah Tyson Rorer authored the cookbook, Mrs. Rorer's Vegetable Cookery and Meat Substitutes in 1909. The book includes a mock veal roast recipe made from lentils, breadcrumbs and peanuts. In 1943, Kellogg made his first soy-based meat analog, called Soy Protose, which contained 32% soy. In 1945, Mildred Lager commented that soybeans "are the best meat substitute from the vegetable kingdom, they will always be used to a great extent by the vegetarian in place of meat."

In July 2016, Impossible Foods launched the Impossible Burger, a beef substitute which claims to offer appearance, taste and cooking properties similar to meat. In April 2019, Burger King partnered with Impossible Foods to launch the plant-based Impossible Whopper, which was released nationwide later that year, becoming one of the most successful product launches in Burger King's history. By October 2019, restaurants, such as Carl's Jr, Hardee's, A&W, Dunkin Donuts, and KFC were selling plant-based meat products. Nestlé entered the plant-based burger market in 2019 with the introduction of the "Awesome Burger". Kellogg's Morningstar Farms brand tested its Incogmeato line of plant-based protein products in early September 2019, with plans for a US-wide rollout in early 2020.

Types 

Some vegetarian meat alternatives are based on centuries-old recipes for seitan (wheat gluten), rice, mushrooms, legumes, tempeh, yam flour or pressed-tofu, with flavoring added to make the finished product taste like chicken, beef, lamb, ham, sausage, seafood, etc. Other alternatives use modified defatted peanut flour, yuba and textured vegetable protein (TVP); yuba and TVP are both soy-based meat alternatives, the former made by layering the thin skin which forms on top of boiled soy milk, and the latter being a dry bulk commodity derived from soy and soy protein concentrate. Some meat alternatives include mycoprotein, such as Quorn which usually uses egg white as a binder. Another type of single cell protein-based meat alternative (which does not use fungi however but rather bacteria) is Calysta.

Production and composition 

Meat analog products are currently made by two basic processes, through either thermoplastic extrusion or fiber spinning. Thermoplastic extrusion involves the adaptation of production processes that are more commonly associated with the making of ready-to-eat cereal products. Extruders are considered to be a cost-effective method of accommodating large-scale productions, and for forming desirable fibers.

The types of ingredients that can be used to create meat substitutes is expanding, from companies like Plentify, which are using high-protein bacteria found in the human microbiome, to companies like Meati Foods, that are cultivating the mycelium of fungi to form steaks, chicken breasts, or fish.

Soy protein isolates or soybean flour and gluten are usually used as foundation for most meat substitutes that are available on the market. Soy protein isolate is a highly pure form of soy protein with a minimum protein content of 90%. The process of extracting the protein from the soybeans starts with the dehulling, or decortication, of the seeds. The seeds are then treated with solvents such as hexane to extract the oil from them. The oil-free soybean meal is then suspended in water and treated with alkali to dissolve the protein while leaving behind the carbohydrates. The alkaline solution is then treated with acidic substances to precipitate the protein, before being washed and dried. The removal of fats and carbohydrates, results in a product that has a relatively neutral flavor. Soy protein is also considered a "complete protein" as it contains all of the essential amino acids that are crucial for proper human growth and development.

Commerce

Meat substitutes represent around 11% of the world's meat and substitutes market . As shown in the graph, this market share is different from region to region. From 2013 to 2021, the world average price of meat substitutes fell continuously, by an overall 33%. The only exception was a 0.3% increase in 2020, compared to 2019. The price will continue to decrease, according to projections by Statista (see average price graph).

The motivation for seeking out meat substitutes varies among consumers. The market for meat alternatives is highly dependent on "meat-reducers", who are primarily motivated by health consciousness and weight management. Consumers who identify as vegan, vegetarian or pescetarian are more likely to endorse concerns regarding animal welfare and/or environmentalism as primary motivators. Additionally, some cultural beliefs and religions place prohibitions on consuming some or all animal products, including Hinduism, Judaism, Islam, Christianity, Jainism, and Buddhism.

Vegan meats are consumed in restaurants, grocery stores, bakeries, vegan school meals, and in homes. The sector for plant-based meats grew by 37% in North America over 2017–18. In 2018–19, sales of plant-based meats in the United States were $895 million, with the global market for meat alternatives forecast to be $140 billion by 2029. Seeking a healthy alternative to meat, curiosity, and trends toward veganism were drivers for the meat alternative market in 2019. The book The End of Animal Farming by Jacy Reese Anthis argues that plant-based food and cultured meat will completely replace animal-based food by 2100.

Impact

Environmental

Besides ethical and health motivations, developing better meat alternatives has the potential to reduce the environmental impact of meat production, an important concern given that the global demand for meat products is predicted to increase by 15 percent by 2031.  Research on meats and no-meat substitutes suggests that no-meat products can offer substantial benefits over the production of beef, and to a lesser extent pork and chicken, in terms of greenhouse gas production, water and land use. 
A 2022 report from the Boston Consulting Group found that investment in improving and scaling up the production of meat and dairy alternatives leads to big greenhouse gas reductions compared with other investments.

According to The Good Food Institute, improving efficiency of the Western diet is crucial for achieving sustainability. As the global population grows, the way land is used will be reconsidered. 33% of the habitable land on Earth is used to support animals. Of all the land used for agriculture, 77% is used on animal agriculture even though this sector only supplies 17% of the total food supply. Plant-based meat can use a potential 47–99% less land than conventional meat does, freeing up more opportunities for production. Of the total water used in global agriculture, 33% goes to animal agriculture while it could be used for drinking water or other growing purposes under a different strategy. Plant-based meat uses 72–99% less water than conventional meat production. 

Pollution is the next largest contribution to wasted water. Pesticides used in animal feed production as well as waste runoff into reservoirs can cause ecological damage and even human illness as well as taking water directly out of the usable supply. Animal agriculture is the main contributor to the food sector greenhouse gas emissions. Production of plant-based meat alternatives emits 30–90% less than conventional meat production. While also contributing less to this total pollution, much of the land being used for animal feed could be used to mitigate the negative effects we’ve already had on the planet through carbon recycling, soil conservation, and renewable energy production. In addition to the ecological harm caused by the current industry, excess antibiotics given to animals cause resistant microbes that may render some of the life-saving drugs used in human medicine useless. Plant-based meat requires no antibiotics and would greatly reduce microbe antibiotic resistance.

Health

In 2021, the American Heart Association stated that there is "limited evidence on the short- and long-term health effects" of plant-based meat alternatives. The same year, the World Health Organization stated that there are "significant knowledge gaps in the nutritional composition" of meat alternatives and more research is needed to investigate their health impacts.

Criticism 
Companies producing plant-based meat alternatives, including Beyond Meat and Impossible Foods, have been criticized for their marketing and makeup of their products as well as their use of animal testing. Dietitians have claimed they are not necessarily healthier than meat due to their highly processed nature and sodium content.

John Mackey, co-founder and CEO of Whole Foods, and Brian Niccol, CEO of Chipotle Mexican Grill, have criticized meat alternatives for being ultra-processed. Chipotle has claimed it will not carry these products at their restaurants due to their highly processed nature. According to CNBC, "Chipotle joins the likes of Taco Bell—Niccol's former employer—and Arby's in committing to excluding meatless meats on its menu." In response, Beyond Meat invited Niccol to visit its manufacturing site to see the production process. Chipotle later developed its own "plant-based chorizo".

Some consulting firms and analysts demand more transparency in terms of the environmental impact of plant-based meat.

Some states have instituted legislation stating that meat alternatives are not allowed to label themselves as "meat". In Louisiana, the so-called, "Truth in Labeling of Food Products Act” was challenged by Tofurkey, complaining of free speech violations and was successful on those grounds.

See also 

 Vegetarian bacon
 Vegetarian hot dogs
 Vegetarian sausage
 Meat-free sausage roll
 
 
 
 
 
 
 
 Leghemoglobin: alters flavor of certain meat alternatives to make them taste even more similar to meat ("simulates" animal blood in these meat alternatives but made from plant-based sources)
 
 Single-cell protein, meat alternatives containing protein extract from pure or mixed cultures of algae, yeasts, fungi, or bacteria or made from air

References

Further reading

Yes, plant-based meat is better for the planet. Vox. 18 November 2021.

 
American inventions
Buddhist cuisine
Chinese inventions
Imitation foods
Lent
Vegetarian cuisine